The Wirral Classic was a women's professional golf tournament on the Ladies European Tour held in England. It was played annually between 1983 and 1988 in Caldy on the Wirral Peninsula in Merseyside, near Liverpool.

Winners

Source:

References

External links
Ladies European Tour

Former Ladies European Tour events
Golf tournaments in England
Defunct sports competitions in England
Recurring sporting events established in 1983
Recurring sporting events disestablished in 1988